Dylber Vrioni (born June 4, 1946)  was the Deputy Prime Minister of Albania and Minister of Finance for the 1992 government of Sali Berisha. He was the Governor of Bank of Albania from September 1993 to December 1994.

References 

20th-century Albanian politicians
Living people
1946 births
Governors of the Bank of Albania
Dylber
Place of birth missing (living people)
Government ministers of Albania
Finance ministers of Albania